Kirkby Glacier is a glacier,  in length. This glacier drains the central Anare Mountains of Antarctica and flows northwest to the sea  from Cape North, and just north of Arthurson Bluff, northern Victoria Land. Richardson Bluff rises from its east side.

Discovery and naming
Kirkby Glacier was named by the Australian National Antarctic Research Expeditions (ANARE) for Sydney L. Kirkby, a surveyor on the ANARE Thala Dan cruise of 1962, led by Phillip Law, which explored the area along this coast.

See also
 History of Antarctica
 List of Antarctic expeditions

References

External links
 Australian Antarctic Names and Medals Committee (AANMC)
 Australian Antarctic Gazetteer
 Scientific Committee on Antarctic Research (SCAR)
 PDF Map of the Australian Antarctic Territory
 Mawson Station

Glaciers of Pennell Coast